Pete or Peter Harris may refer to:

Sportspeople
Pete Harris (American football) (1957–2006), American football player
Peter Harris (boxer) (born 1962), Welsh boxer
Peter Harris (surfer) (born 1958), Australian surfer
Peter Harris (footballer) (1925–2003), English association football (soccer) player

Businessmen
Peter L. Harris (born 1943), American businessman
Peter R. Harris, former CEO of Compass Group
Peter Harris (entrepreneur) (born 1934), English businessman

Others
Peter Harris (buccaneer) (died 1680), 17th-century pirate
Peter Harris (director) (1933–2021), British television director
Peter Harris (producer) (born 1961), electronic dance music record producer and disc jockey
Peter Harris (public servant), Australian government official
Peter Charles Harris (1865–1951), officer in the U.S. Army
Fr. Pete Harris, character in Zoo (TV series)

See also
Peter Harrison (disambiguation)